The Salem Saturday Market is an organization operating a series of five farmers' markets in Salem, Oregon, United States. Opened in 1998, Saturday, Monday, Wednesday, Thursday, and holiday markets are operating, as of 2018.

The market celebrated its twentieth anniversary in 2018.

See also
 Eugene Saturday Market
 Lane County Farmers Market, Eugene
 Portland Farmers Market (Oregon)

References

External links

 
Agriculture in Oregon
Culture of Salem, Oregon
Economy of Salem, Oregon
Events in Oregon
Farmers' markets in the United States
Organizations based in Salem, Oregon
Tourist attractions in Salem, Oregon